Porozumienie Centrum (PC) was a Polish Christian democratic political party. The party rose in 1990. Its chairman was Jarosław Kaczyński. In its programme, the PC opposed socialism and was anti-communist. In 1997 PC joined the Solidarity Electoral Action (AWS) movement, but in 2001 Lech and Jarosław Kaczyński created a new party, called Law and Justice as the successor of the PC.

1993 Leaders
 Jarosław Kaczyński, Warszawa, 
 Jan Parys, Warszawa, 
 Tomasz Jackowski, Warszawa II, 
 Lech Kaczyński, Nowy Sącz, 
 Wojciech Ziembiński, Warszawa, 
 Krzysztof Tchórzewski, Siedlce, 
 Teresa Liszcz, Lublin, 
 Edmund Krasowski, Gdańsk, 
 Adam Glapiński, Olsztyn, 
 Antoni Tokarczuk, Bydgoszcz, 
 Adam Lipiński, Wrocław, 
 Ludwik Dorn, Łódź.

Electoral results

Presidential

Sejm

Senate

References

1990 establishments in Poland
2002 disestablishments in Poland
Anti-communism in Poland
Anti-communist parties
Centrist parties in Poland
Christian democratic parties in Europe
Catholic political parties
Conservative parties in Poland
Defunct political parties in Poland
National conservative parties
Political parties disestablished in 2002
Political parties established in 1990